William Banks may refer to:

 William Banks (alderman) (born 1949), alderman in Chicago
 William Banks (rugby) (1925–1991), Welsh rugby union and rugby league footballer of the 1940s and 1950s
 William Stott Banks (1820–1872), English antiquary
 William Banks (died 1676) (1636–1676), English politician
 William Banks (barrister) (1719–1761), English politician
 William Banks (cricketer) (1822–1901), Welsh-born English cricketer
 William Banks (footballer) (1893–1963), English footballer
 William V. Banks (1903–1985), radio station executive in Detroit
 William M. Banks (1915–1983), American flying ace 
 William C. Banks (born 1948), American law professor
 William Mitchell Banks (1842–1904), Scottish surgeon

See also
 Willie Banks (disambiguation)
 Billy Banks (disambiguation)
 William Bankes (disambiguation)